Argyrogramma is a genus of moths of the family Noctuidae.

Species
 Argyrogramma signata Fabricius, 1794
 Argyrogramma subaurea Dufay, 1972
 Argyrogramma verruca Fabricius, 1794

References

 Argyrogramma at Markku Savela's Lepidoptera and Some Other Life Forms
 Natural History Museum Lepidoptera genus database

Plusiinae
Moth genera